The 2012 IAAF World Indoor Championships in Athletics was the 14th edition of the global-level indoor track and field competition and was held between March 9–11, 2012 at the Ataköy Athletics Arena in Istanbul, Turkey. It was the first of four IAAF World Athletics Series events in 2012, which includes the World Race Walking Cup, the World Junior Championships and the World Half Marathon Championships.

Preparation

The IAAF announced on March 25, 2007, at an IAAF Council meeting in Mombasa, Kenya that it had received bids from Turkey and Qatar to host the 2010 IAAF World Indoor Championships. In November 2007 at an IAAF Council meeting in Monaco, Doha was selected to host the 2010 edition, but due to the quality of the Istanbul bid, the Turkish city was chosen to host the following edition of the competition in 2012. It will be the first time that Turkey has hosted a major global athletics event. Previously, the highest level events that the country had hosted included the Athletics at the 2005 Summer Universiade and lower-level sections of the European Cup/European Team Championships.

The events took place at the 7,450-seater Ataköy Athletics Arena, which was constructed especially for the event in the Ataköy neighborhood of Bakırköy next to the Sinan Erdem Dome. The initial bid featured the Dome as the host stadium, but the venue was later changed as the Sinan Erdem Dome was host to the 2010 FIBA World Championship in the months before the event. The construction of the Ataköy Arena was behind schedule, leading to the cancellation of some tester events, meaning that the Turkish Indoor Championships  in late January was the first competition to be held there.

Schedule

All dates are EET (UTC+2)

Results

Men

2008 | 2010 | 2012 | 2014 | 2016

Women

2008 | 2010 | 2012 | 2014 | 2016

Medal table

Gallery from the games
Photos from the games in Istanbul:

Participating nations

 (1)
 (2)
 (2)
 (2)
 (2)
 (1)
 (2)
 (1)
 (6)
 (3)
 (2)
 (6)
 (4)
 (2)
 (17)
 (3)
 (2)
 (1)
 (2)
 (4)
 (7)
 (1)
 (2)
 (8)
 (1)
 (1)
 (2)
 (4)
 (1)
 (1)
 (13)
 (2)
 (1)
 (2)
 (1)
 (1)
 (1)
 (10)
 (2)
 (13)
 (1)
 (2)
 (1)
 (1)
 (1)
 (1)
 (1)
 (1)
 (2)
 (10)
 (1)
 (2)
 (11)
 (2)
 (1)
 (2)
 (17)
 (3)
 (1)
 (30)
 (7)
 (1)
 (2)
 (1)
 (2)
 (2)
 (1)
 (2)
 (3)
 (2)
 (1)
 (1)
 (3)
 (2)
 (3)
 (2)
 (14)
 (2)
 (10)
 (1)
 (6)
 (9)
 (2)
 (1)
 (2)
 (2)
 (1)
 (1)
 (5)
 (1)
 (1)
 (1)
 (1)
 (1)
 (1)
 (1)
 (1)
 (1)
 (2)
 (1)
 (2)
 (1)
 (2)
 (6)
 (1)
 (2)
 (4)
 (1)
 (1)
 (4)
 (1)
 (1)
 (1)
 (1)
 (2)
 (2)
 (2)
 (1)
 (2)
 (1)
 (1)
 (1)
 (13)
 (2)
 (1)
 (3)
 (1)
 (13)
 (42)
 (2)
 (2)
 (1)
 (2)
 (1)
 (1)
 (2)
 (1)
 (1)
 (1)
 (1)
 (1)
 (2)
 (1)
 (4)
 (2)
 (3)
 (1)
 (20)
 (2)
 (1)
 (4)
 (2)
 (2)
 (2)
 (1)
 (1)
 (2)
 (7)
 (16)
 (1)
 (1)
 (2)
 (25)
 (2)
 (46)
 (2)
 (2)
 (5)
 (2)
 (4)
 (2)

References

External links
Official website
IAAF competition website
Official entry standards
Turkish athletics history, at a glance – Istanbul 2012  from IAAF

 
World Indoor
Iaaf World Indoor Championships 2012
2012 IAAF World Indoor Championships
International athletics competitions hosted by Turkey
March 2012 sports events in Turkey
2012 in Istanbul